Radio LaB 97.1FM, formerly Luton FM is a student radio station, managed, produced and presented by students at the Luton town centre campus of the University of Bedfordshire in Luton, Bedfordshire (formerly known as the University of Luton). Radio LaB stands for Radio Luton and Bedfordshire. Radio LaB is now a full-time radio station with a community licence.

History
Radio LaB started its initial broadcast on 1 May 1997. When the station started it was called Luton FM and each year throughout May, the station broadcast on 87.9FM from a transmitter in Farley Hill, Luton. The studio and production area was based in the School of Media, Art and Design within the Luton campus of the University of Bedfordshire. Luton FM also broadcast on the internet from the station's website.

In 2001, the station was broadcast online for the first time, and started the careers of many radio professionals of today.

The Luton FM website in 2003 became a major tool in the promotion of the station as it was the second year that the station was streamed online for the duration of the stations 28-day Restricted Service Licence (RSL). In September 2004, Luton FM broadcast online for the first time outside of its usual May remit.

In 2008, Luton FM changed its name and relaunched as LaB Radio (Luton and Bedfordshire Radio), which incorporates Luton and Bedfordshire. In 2009 the station has changed its name once more to Radio LaB and underwent major rebranding.  Due to the success of the station this year, 2009 was the last year of the stations twelve-year stretch as an RSL station, as Ofcom awarded the station with a five-year full-time community licence starting in January 2010.

In 2010, the station name was changed to Radio LaB, and broadcast on the internet. Since then, the station holds a community licence and broadcasts to Luton and across Bedfordshire. In 2011, after the new Campus Centre was completed, the studio was moved to a new studio in the Student Centre at the Luton campus of the University of Bedfordshire. Radio LaB now broadcasts from here 24/7.

In October 2014, Radio LaB was granted a five-year community radio licence extension by Ofcom, allowing the station to continue to broadcast on 97.1FM until April 2020. In March 2020 this was further extended by Ofcom until April 2025.

Personnel
The station is managed each year by final-year students, and their final university grade based on their performance organising, promoting and running Radio LaB. Final responsibility for the running of the station, however, rests with Radio LaB Coordinator Terry Lee, who is the overall licensee for Radio LaB.

Alumni
Past Luton FM Managers/Presenters include:
Melvin Odoom and Rickie Haywood Williams who both are the award winning Morning presenters of Kiss 100 London.

Recognition 
Radio LaB won Community Radio Awards in 2017, 2019, and two in 2020.

See also
 Three Counties Radio

References

External links
 Main station website
 https://listenagain.canstream.co.uk/radiolab/
 http://radio.canstream.co.uk:8043/live.mp3
 Celebrating ten years

University of Bedfordshire
Radio stations in Bedfordshire
Student radio in the United Kingdom
Luton